"Shutdown" is a song by English rapper Skepta, released as the second single from his fourth album Konnichiwa (2016) on 26 April 2015 through his Boy Better Know record label. A music video for the song was uploaded to YouTube on the day of the song's release. "Shutdown" peaked at number 39 on the UK Singles Chart. The song samples speech from a Vine video created by Canadian rapper Drake. The song was covered by English rock band Slaves in the BBC Radio 1 Live Lounge and has since been included in the band's live setlists. The track is featured in NBA 2K17 and Tony Hawk's Pro Skater 1 + 2 and Watch Dogs: Legion.

Music video
The official music video for the song, shot in the Barbican Estate and lasting two minutes and fifty seconds, was uploaded on 26 April 2015 to Skepta's Vevo channel on YouTube. It was directed by Grace Ladoja and produced by Skepta and Ragz Originale. It was the last music video aired on MTV Base UK before its closure on 31st March 2022.

Chart performance

Weekly charts

Release history

References

2015 singles
2015 songs
Skepta songs
Songs written by Skepta